Murder at Midnight may refer to:

Murder at Midnight (radio series), an old-time radio show that aired on WJZ
Vampire at Midnight aka Murder at Midnight, a 1988 American film directed by Gregory McClatchy
Murder at Midnight (1931 film), an American film directed by Frank R. Strayer
Murder at Midnight (1994 film)